Sherwin Peak may refer to
 Sherwin Peak (California), near Mammoth, California
 A peak in the Queen Elizabeth Range (Antarctica)